"Lady of Spain" is a popular standard song written in 1931, popularized in 1952 by Eddie Fisher.

Lady of Spain or Spanish Ladies may also refer to:
Lady of Spain, an album by organist Ethel Smith
 "Spanish Lady", a traditional Irish folk song
 "Spanish Ladies", a traditional English naval song (sea shanty)
 The Spanish Lady, unfinished opera by Edward Elgar
 female members of the Spanish nobility
 female of the Spanish people

See also
 "Lady of Elche", an Iberian sculpture from the 4th century BC